Edison Park is a commuter rail station along Metra's Union Pacific Northwest Line in the Edison Park neighborhood of Chicago, Illinois.

As of April 25, 2022, Edison Park is served by 44 trains (22 in each direction) on weekdays, by 31 trains (16 inbound, 15 outbound) on Saturdays, and by 19 trains (nine inbound, 10 outbound) on Sundays.

Edison Park Station is the northernmost station along the Union Pacific Northwest Line within Chicago's city limits. It contains both a station house along the tracks and an open shelter in between two of them. Parking is available (with vendors), but only along the tracks on North Olmstead Avenue between Ozark and Olympia Avenues.

CTA Bus Connections
  68 Northwest Highway

References

External links
Metra - Edison Park Station
Edison Park Station (Chicago Railfan.net)
Station from Oliphant Avenue from Google Maps Street View

Metra stations in Chicago
Former Chicago and North Western Railway stations
Railway stations in the United States opened in 1956